Demonstratives (abbreviated ) are words, such as this and that, used to indicate which entities are being referred to and to distinguish those entities from others. They are typically deictic; their meaning depending on a particular frame of reference and cannot be understood without context. Demonstratives are often used in spatial deixis (where the speaker or sometimes the listener are to provide context), but also in intra-discourse reference (including abstract concepts) or anaphora, where the meaning is dependent on something other than the relative physical location of the speaker, for example whether something is currently being said or was said earlier.

Demonstrative constructions include demonstrative adjectives or demonstrative determiners, which qualify nouns (as in Put that coat on); and demonstrative pronouns, which stand independently (as in Put that on). The demonstratives in English are this, that, these, those, and the archaic yon and yonder, along with this one or that one as substitutes for the pronoun use of this or that.

Distal and proximal demonstratives

Many languages, such as English and Chinese, make a two-way distinction between demonstratives. Typically, one set of demonstratives is proximal, indicating objects close to the speaker (English this), and the other series is distal, indicating objects further removed from the speaker (English that).

Other languages, like Nandi, Hawaiian, Latin, Spanish, Portuguese, Italian, Armenian, Serbo-Croatian, Macedonian, Georgian, Basque, Korean, Japanese, Ukrainian, Bengali, and Sri Lankan Tamil make a three-way distinction. Typically there is a distinction between proximal or first person (objects near to the speaker), medial or second person (objects near to the addressee), and distal or third person (objects far from both). So for example, in Portuguese: 
 Esta maçã
                   "this apple"
 Essa maçã
                   "that apple (near you)"
 Aquela maçã
                   "that apple (over there, away from both of us)"

Further oppositions are created with place adverbs.
 Essa maçã aqui
                   "this apple (next to me or next to you-and-me)"
 Essa maçã aí
                   "that apple (next to you)"
 Aquela maçã ali
                   "that apple (close to you-and-me)"
 Aquela maçã lá
                   "that apple (which is far from you-and-me or is in another distant place from you-and-me)"

in Italian:
 Questa mela
                   "this apple"
 Codesta mela
                   "that apple (near you)"
 Quella mela
                    "yon apple (over there, away from both of us)"

in Hawaiian:
 Kēia ʻukulele
                   "this ukulele"
 kēnā ʻukulele
                   "that ukulele (near you)"
 kēlā ʻukulele
                   "yon ukulele (over there, away from both of us)"

in Armenian (based on the proximal "s", medial "d/t", and distal "n"):

and, in Georgian:

and, in Ukrainian (note that Ukrainian has not only number, but also three grammatical genders in singular):
 цей чоловік, ця жінка, це яблуко, ці яблука
                   "this man", "this woman", "this apple", "these apples"
 той чоловік, та жінка, те яблуко, ті яблука
                   "that man", "that woman", "that apple", "those apples"
 он той чоловік, он та жінка, он те яблуко, он ті яблука
                   "yon man (over there, away from both of us)", "that woman (over there, away from both of us)", "yon apple (over there, away from both of us)", "yons apples (over there, away from both of us)"

and, in Japanese:

In Nandi (Kalenjin of Kenya, Uganda and Eastern Congo):

Chego chu, Chego choo, Chego chuun

"this milk", "that milk" (near the second person) and "that milk" (away from the first and second person, near a third person or even further away).

Ancient Greek has a three-way distinction between ὅδε (hóde "this here"), οὗτος (hoûtos "this"), and ἐκεῖνος (ekeînos "that").

Spanish, Tamil and Seri also make this distinction. French has a two-way distinction, with the use of postpositions "-ci" (proximal) and "-là" (distal) as in cet homme-ci and cet homme-là, as well as the pronouns ce and cela/ça.  English has an archaic but occasionally used three-way distinction of this, that, and yonder.

Arabic has also a three-way distinction in its formal Classical and Modern Standard varieties. Very rich, with more than 70 variants, the demonstrative pronouns in Arabic principally change depending on the gender and the number. They mark a distinction in number for singular, dual, and plural. For example :
  (haːðaː arrajul) 'this man'.
  (ðaːka arrajul) 'that man'.
  (ðaːlika arrajul) 'that man' (over there).

In Modern German (and the Scandinavian languages), the non-selective deictic das Kind, der Kleine, die Kleine and the selective one das Kind, der Kleine, die Kleine are homographs, but they are spoken differently. The non-selective deictics are unstressed whereas the selective ones (demonstratives) are stressed. There is a second selective deictic, namely dieses Kind, dieser Kleine, diese Kleine. Distance either from the speaker or from the addressee is either marked by the opposition between these two deictics or by the addition of a place deictic.

Distance-marking Thing Demonstrative
                   dieses Mädchen ~ das Mädchen
                   "this girl" ~ "that girl"

Thing Demonstrative plus Distance-marking Place Demonstrative
                   das Mädchen hier ~ das Mädchen da
                   dieses Mädchen hier ~ dieses Mädchen da
                   "this girl here" ~ "that girl over there"

A distal demonstrative exists in German, cognate to the English yonder, but it is used only in formal registers.
                   jenes Mädchen
                   "yonder girl"

Cognates of "yonder" still exist in some Northern English and Scots dialects;

"This shop here"

"That shop across the street"

"Yon shop down the street"
(that shop that is/used to be down the street)

There are languages which make a four-way distinction, such as Northern Sami:
 Dát biila
                   "this car"
 Diet biila
                   "that car (near you)"
 Duot biila
                   "that car (over there, away from both of us but rather near)"
 Dot biila
                   "that car (over there, far away)"

These four-way distinctions are often termed proximal, mesioproximal, mesiodistal, and distal.

Many non-European languages make further distinctions; for example, whether the object referred to is uphill or downhill from the speaker, whether the object is visible or not (as in Malagasy), and whether the object can be pointed to as a whole or only in part. The Eskimo–Aleut languages, and the Kiranti branch of the Sino-Tibetan language family are particularly well known for their many contrasts.

The demonstratives in Seri are compound forms based on the definite articles (themselves derived from verbs) and therefore incorporate the positional information of the articles (standing, sitting, lying, coming, going) in addition to the three-way spatial distinction. This results in a quite elaborated set of demonstratives.

Demonstrative series in other languages
Latin had several sets of demonstratives, including hic, haec, hoc ("this near me"); iste, ista, istud ("that near you"); and ille, illa, illud ("that over there") – note that Latin has not only number, but also three grammatical genders. The third set of Latin demonstratives (ille, etc.), developed into the definite articles in most Romance languages, such as el, la, los, las in Spanish, and le, la, les in French.

With the exception of Romanian, and some varieties of Spanish and Portuguese, the neuter gender has been lost in the Romance languages. Spanish and Portuguese have kept neuter demonstratives:
{|
!  Spanish     !! Portuguese  !! gender
|-
|  este    ||  este   || masculine
|-
|  esta    ||  esta   || feminine
|-
| 
|-
|  esto ||  isto || neuter
|}

Some forms of Spanish (Caribbean Spanish, Andalusian Spanish, etc.) also occasionally employ ello, which is an archaic survival of the neuter pronoun from Latin illud.

Neuter demonstratives refer to ideas of indeterminate gender, such as abstractions and groups of heterogeneous objects, and has a limited agreement in Portuguese, for example, "all of that" can be translated as "todo aquele" (m), "toda aquela" (f) or "tudo aquilo" (n) in Portuguese, although the neuter forms require a masculine adjective agreement: "Tudo (n) aquilo (n) está quebrado (m)" (All of that is broken).

Classical Chinese had three main demonstrative pronouns: proximal  (this), distal  (that), and distance-neutral  (this or that). Modern Mandarin has two main demonstratives, proximal / and distal ; its use of the three Classical demonstratives has become mostly idiomatic, although  continues to be used with some frequency in modern written Chinese.

Hungarian has two spatial demonstratives: ez (this) and az (that). These inflect for number and case even in attributive position (attributes usually remain uninflected in Hungarian) with possible orthographic changes; e.g., ezzel (with this), abban (in that). A third degree of deixis is also possible in Hungarian, with the help of the am- prefix: amaz (that there). The use of this, however, is emphatic (when the speaker wishes to emphasize the distance) and not mandatory.

The Cree language has a special demonstrative for "things just gone out of sight," and Ilocano, a language of the Philippines, has three words for this referring to a visible object, a fourth for things not in view and a fifth for things that no longer exist." The Tiriyó language has a demonstrative for "things audible but non-visible"

While most languages and language families have demonstrative systems, some have systems highly divergent from or more complex than the relatively simple systems employed in Indo-European languages. In Yupik languages, notably in the Chevak Cup’ik language, there exists a 29-way distinction in demonstratives, with demonstrative indicators distinguished according to placement in a three-dimensional field around the interlocutor(s), as well as by visibility and whether or not the object is in motion.

Demonstrative determiners and pronouns
It is relatively common for a language to distinguish between demonstrative determiners or demonstrative adjectives (sometimes also called determinative demonstratives, adjectival demonstratives or adjectival demonstrative pronouns) and demonstrative pronouns (sometimes called independent demonstratives, substantival demonstratives, independent demonstrative pronouns or substantival demonstrative pronouns).

A demonstrative determiner modifies a noun:

This apple is good.
I like those houses.

A demonstrative pronoun stands on its own, replacing rather than modifying a noun:

This is good.
I like those.

There are six common demonstrative pronouns in English: this, that, these, those, none, and neither, Some dialects, such as Southern American English, also use yon and yonder, where the latter is usually employed as a demonstrative determiner.  Author Bill Bryson laments the "losses along the way" of yon and yonder:

Demonstrative adverbs
Many languages have sets of demonstrative adverbs that are closely related to the demonstrative pronouns in a language.  For example, corresponding to the demonstrative pronoun that are the adverbs such as then (= "at that time"), there (= "at that place"), thither (= "to that place"), thence (= "from that place"); equivalent adverbs corresponding to the demonstrative pronoun this are now, here, hither, hence.  A similar relationship exists between the interrogative pronoun what and the interrogative adverbs when, where, whither, whence.  See pro-form for a full table.

Discourse deixis

As mentioned above, while the primary function of demonstratives is to provide spatial references of concrete objects (that (building), this (table)), there is a secondary function: referring to items of discourse.  For example:

This sentence is short.
This is what I mean: I am happy with him.
That way of looking at it is wrong.
I said her dress looked hideous. She didn't like that.

In the above, this sentence refers to the sentence being spoken, and the pronoun this refers to what is about to be spoken; that way refers to "the previously mentioned way", and the pronoun that refers to the content of the previous statement. These are abstract entities of discourse, not concrete objects. Each language may have subtly different rules on how to use demonstratives to refer to things previously spoken, currently being spoken, or about to be spoken. In English, that (or occasionally those) refers to something previously spoken, while this (or occasionally these) refers to something about to be spoken (or, occasionally, something being simultaneously spoken).

Notes

See also

Deixis
Pro-form

References

External links 
Demonstratives & Indexicals at Internet Encyclopedia of Philosophy

Parts of speech